Reuters Market Data System (RMDS) is an open market data platform provided by Thomson Reuters. RMDS is used to transport, integrate and manage financial data from stock exchanges and other data sources to end users (such as a bank or enterprise) using multicast or broadcast technology. The underlying protocols are called Reuters Reliable Control Protocol (RRCP) and the Reuters Reliable Messaging Protocol (RRMP)

Features
The last version of RMDS, version 6, included Reuters Wire Format (RWF) as a major improvement to Marketfeed (MF) used in RMDS version 5 and prior technologies like Triarch, TIB Market Data Distribution System (TIB).  

Major components of the platform include Market Data Hub (MDH) and the Point-to-Point Server (P2PS). These components configured together create a basic RMDS deployment. RMDS was commonly used to feed clients such Reuters' analysis and trading platform Reuters 3000 Xtra. 

This platform has been replaced by Thomson Reuters Enterprise Platform for Real-Time (TREP-RT), colloquially known as TREP.

References

External links
 RMDS Product website
 RMDS Support website

Reuters
Thomson Reuters